A front-end bra (also known by other terms such as car bra, bonnet bra, front-end cover, hood bra, auto bra, hood mask, car mask, etc.) is a type of vinyl (usually black) cover that attaches to the front of a car or other vehicle to protect the bumper, hood, and sides of the fender from scratches. The inside of the bra is lined with a feltlike material.

History
Bill Colgan, founder of Colgan Custom Manufacturing, Inc. successfully operated a trim and upholstery business in Burbank, California, for fifteen years prior to creating the car bra business. 

The "Original Car Bra" was invented in 1961 when three German engineers from Lockheed walked into Bill's upholstery shop, asking Colgan if he could redesign a protective cover for their personal Porsches. 

The very first pattern was for the Porsche 356. The first order for the protective covers for the cars’ front fascia (a.k.a. ‘Car bras’) was for 12 units. After that, he was asked to make 150. Yet, after the second order was given to the buyers, he stopped making car bras, in order to concentrate on the main business. 

And only by the mid-1970s he realized that this business took over upholstery, and he concentrated on car bras production, having given this name to his invention. The pattern Colgan designed was the creation of the one-piece "Original Car Bra." The word 'bra' came from the woman's breast-support undergarment, the brassiere.

The peak years of popularity of the front-end car bra were the 1980s and 1990s in the United States.

In 1989, Gönen Leather Industries took on the business of creating car bras for all car makes Worldwide. Gönen Leather Industries then partnered up with Marco Anderson, CEO of Cobra Auto Accessories, to create a new style of Auto Masks that would be adapted to the Car Culture we see today. 

Each stage in mask preparation requires special work depending on the individual make and model of the vehicle.

Types
There are several types of car bras, including full, sport, and T-style. The 'sport' car bra covers less of the front of the vehicle (displaying more of the car's original looks) than the 'full'. The 'T-style' car bra is generally intended for trucks, SUVs and similar. The car bra can also be carbon-based, ostensibly to absorb the microwaves used in police radar equipment and thus minimize the risk of detection when speeding. Car bras are most commonly black, but are available in other colors to match the color of the vehicle.

The 'clear' car bra is actually a stick-on, transparent, protective film that can extend from the front end over the entire car body.

Some automobile manufacturers use larger bras together with disguising panels, plastic and/or tape to cover an entire vehicle (or certain parts of it) to conceal its design when developing and road-testing.

Cobra Auto Accessories introduced Diamond Style hood bras that trended in the JDM VIP car Community.

See also
 Development mule
 Paint protection film
 Wind deflector

References

Automotive accessories